Beaumont Hotel may refer to:

United Kingdom
Beaumont Hotel, London

United States
Beaumont Hotel (Ouray, Colorado), listed on the National Register of Historic Places (NRHP) in Ouray County
Beaumont Hotel (Beaumont, Kansas), listed on the NRHP in Butler County
Beaumont Hotel (Mayville, Wisconsin), listed on the NRHP in Dodge County